In mathematics, an Abel equation of the first kind, named after Niels Henrik Abel, is any ordinary differential equation that is cubic in the unknown function. In other words, it is an equation of the form

where .

Properties
The substitution  brings the Abel equation of the first kind to the "Abel equation of the second kind" of the form

The substitution

 

brings the Abel equation of the first kind to the canonical form

Notes

References
. (Old link: On the Solution of the Unforced Damped Duffing Oscillator with No Linear Stiffness Term) 
Construction of Exact Parametric or Closed Form Solutions of Some Unsolvable Classes of Nonlinear ODEs (Abel's Nonlinear ODEs of the First Kind and Relative Degenerate Equations)
Mancas, S. C., Rosu, Haret C., Integrable dissipative nonlinear second order differential equations via factorizations and Abel equations. Physics Letters A 377 (2013) 1434–1438. [arXiv.org:1212.3636v3]

Ordinary differential equations